Sullivan Péan (born 27 October 1999) is a French professional footballer who plays as a goalkeeper for  club Dunkerque on loan from Caen.

Career
Péan made his professional debut with Caen in a 3–1 Ligue 2 loss to Paris FC on 31 October 2020. He made his Coupe de France debut in a 1–0 loss to Paris Saint-Germain on 10 February 2021.

On 24 June 2022, Péan moved to Dunkerque on loan.

Career statistics

References

External links
 
 SM Caen Profile

1999 births
Living people
People from Cherbourg-Octeville
French footballers
Association football goalkeepers
Stade Malherbe Caen players
USL Dunkerque players
Ligue 2 players
Championnat National 2 players
Championnat National 3 players
Sportspeople from Manche
Footballers from Normandy